The 1995 Kumho Tyres Suzuki Cup was the first running of the series. It was based around nine rounds following the 1995 Australian Touring Car Championship and Australian Super Touring Championship trail.  Over 32 cars entered the series which was won by speedway driver Adam Clarke.  The series was supported by Suzuki importer ATECO and launched the careers of NASCAR Truck driver Clarke, V8 Supercar drivers Warren Luff, Phillip Scifleet, Damian White and Anthony Robson as well as Formula 3000 competitor Andrej Pavicevic and A1 Grand Prix driver Christian Jones.

Calendar
The series started at Oran Park in April, finishing ate the Bathurst 1000 weekend in October.

Drivers

References

 1995 Standings
 Youtube. Rd 2 Lakeside
 Youtube. Rd 3 Winton race 1
 Youtube. Rd 3 Winton race 2
 Red Line GTi web page

Suzuki Cup